Shag Lake is a lake in the Northland Region of New Zealand. It is close to the coast of the Tasman Sea and about 20 km south of Waipoua Forest.

See also
List of lakes in New Zealand

References

Lakes of the Northland Region
Kaipara District